Mathias Hönerbach (born 13 April 1962) is a German football coach and a former player.

Honours
 UEFA Cup finalist: 1985–86
 DFB-Pokal winner: 1982–83
 Bundesliga runner-up: 1981–82, 1988–89

References

External links
 

1962 births
Living people
German footballers
Germany under-21 international footballers
German football managers
Bayer 04 Leverkusen players
Bayer 04 Leverkusen II players
1. FC Köln players
1. FC Saarbrücken players
FC Viktoria Köln managers
Bundesliga players
2. Bundesliga players
Association football defenders
Footballers from Cologne
West German footballers